Pontibacter actiniarum  is a Gram-negative, heterotrophic and aerobic bacterium from the genus of Pontibacter which has been isolated from the Rudnaya Bay from the Pacific Ocean.

References

External links
Type strain of Pontibacter actiniarum at BacDive -  the Bacterial Diversity Metadatabase

Cytophagia
Bacteria described in 2005